Thomas Parke D'Invilliers is both a pen name of Francis Scott Fitzgerald and a character in his quasi-autobiographical first novel, This Side Of Paradise.  In the novel, which is more or less a roman à clef, D'Invilliers represents the poet John Peale Bishop, a friend of Fitzgerald's at Princeton and a member of the 1917 class.

The epigraph for Fitzgerald's The Great Gatsby features a poem ostensibly by D'Invilliers called Then Wear the Gold Hat.

 Then wear the gold hat, if that will move her;
 If you can bounce high, bounce for her too,
 Till she cry “Lover, gold-hatted, high-bouncing lover,
 I must have you!”

External links
Then Wear the Gold Hat

D'Invilliers, Thomas Parke
F. Scott Fitzgerald